The governor of Kinsale was a military officer who commanded the garrison at Kinsale and Charles Fort in County Cork. The office became a sinecure and in 1833 was to be abolished from the next vacancy.

List of governors of Kinsale and Charles Fort

Governors
1690: Charles Churchill
1693: The Earl of Inchiquin
1719: Lord Harry Powlett
1723: Humphrey Gore
1726: Gervais Parker
1739–1740: John Ligonier
1749: Robert Frazer
 Philip Anstruther
1759–1764: John Folliott
1765–1770: The Earl of Drogheda
20 March 1770: James Gisborne
8 September 1770–1801: The Lord Rossmore
1801–1806: William Neville Gardiner
1806–1819: Sir Cornelius Cuyler
1819–1827: Sir David Baird
1827–1830: William Guard
1830–1849: Sir Warren Marmaduke Peacocke

Lieutenant-governors
: James Waller (died 1702)
 Henry Hawley (died 1724)
1724: George Bate
1725: Gervais Parker
1747–1759: John Folliott
    –1776: Nicholas Price
1776–    : Sir Francis James Buchanan
1783–1786: John Hancock
1786–1789: George Bernard
1789–1827: Arthur Browne
1827–1829: Sir William Inglis
1829–1833: John Sulivan Wood

References

History of County Cork
Kinsale